The Instruction of Ankhsheshonq (or Ankhsheshonqy) is an Ancient Egyptian papyrus that has been tentatively dated to the Ptolemaic period, although the content may be earlier in origin. It contains an introductory narrative and a list of maxims on many topics, its style has been described as pragmatic and humorous. The papyrus was obtained in 1896 by the British Museum (papyrus #10508).

It is twenty-eight pages long, with major damage on pages 1–2 and 24–28.

Sources 

Lichtheim, Miriam (2006). Ancient Egyptian Literature: The Late Period. University of California Press. Pages 159–180.

External links 

Thus Wrote 'Onchsheshonqy: An Introductory Grammar of Demotic by Janet H. Johnson. 3rd ed. Oriental Institute of the University of Chicago, 2000.

Ancient Egyptian instruction literature